John Fawcett FRCS FRCP (1866–1944) was an English surgeon who was dean of the Guy's Hospital medical school. He was born in Brixton and educated at Dulwich College. He graduated from the University of London.

References 

1866 births
1944 deaths
Fellows of the Royal College of Surgeons
Alumni of the University of London
Fellows of the Royal College of Physicians
People from Brixton
People educated at Dulwich College
Physicians of Guy's Hospital
English surgeons